Mugila Mallige is a 1985 Indian Kannada language film written and directed by K. Balachander and produced by his own Kavithalaya Productions. Starring Saritha and Srinath in the lead roles, the film also featured Ramakrishna and Ashok in pivotal roles. Saritha received a Filmfare award for her performance.

The film was a remake of Balachander's own Tamil film Thamarai Nenjam. The film had Suresh Krissna as an assistant director working under Balachander.

Cast 
 Srinath
 Saritha
 Ashok
 Ramakrishna
 Pavithra
 Shivaram
 Rama Hariharan
 Baby Seetha
 R. Sundaramoorthy as Sundaramoorthy

Soundtrack 

V. S. Narasimhan composed the music for the soundtracks and lyrics written by R. N. Jayagopal. The album consists of four soundtracks.

Awards 
 Saritha – Filmfare Award for Best Actress

References 

1985 films
1980s Kannada-language films
Films directed by K. Balachander
Films about women in India
Kannada remakes of Tamil films
Films with screenplays by K. Balachander
Films scored by V. S. Narasimhan